Elections for the House of Assembly were held in Cape Colony in 1904. The election was a victory for the Progressives under Leander Starr Jameson, who had first achieved prominence for his role in the ill-fated Jameson Raid.

The incumbent Prime Minister Gordon Sprigg had been elected in 1898 as a Progressive, however the Progressives had been wracked by internal divisions. Whilst most of the party had been able to reconcile under Jameson, Sprigg and his Commissioner of Public Works Arthur Douglass, had been forced to contest the election as Independent Progressives. Both of them would lose their seats to Progressive candidates. The election also saw former Prime Minister William Schreiner lose his seat. Sprigg would resign as Prime Minister some days after the last results were announced, and was succeeded by Jameson. Following the election James Tennant Molteno would be replaced by John X. Merriman as leader of the South African Party.

Thirteen constituencies were uncontested. Following the election of 95 members, Act 4 was passed, which gave a further twelve seats to the House. These were elected through by-elections in the same year.

Results

Statistics

References

Cape
Elections in the Cape Colony
Parliamentary election